Geovani Reis Nascimento Júnior (born 15 May 2001), known as just Geovani is a Brazilian professional footballer who plays as a midfielder for Portuguese club Vitória Guimarães B on loan from Barcelona Capela.

Career
Geovani is a youth product of Famalicão having joined their youth academy in 2019, and after playing with their reserves was promoted to the senior team in 2021. He made his professional debut with Famalicão in a 1–0 Taça da Liga win over Estoril on 1 August 2021.

References

External links
 
 

2001 births
People from Marabá
Sportspeople from Pará
Living people
Association football midfielders
Brazilian footballers
F.C. Famalicão players
Vitória S.C. B players
Primeira Liga players
Brazilian expatriate footballers
Brazilian expatriate sportspeople in Portugal
Expatriate footballers in Portugal